WSTZ-FM (106.7 FM, "Z106.7") is a classic rock music formatted radio station in Jackson, Mississippi, but is licensed to Vicksburg, Mississippi.  WSTZ is owned by iHeartMedia (formerly Clear Channel Communications until September 2014).  WSTZ serves Jackson and surrounding area with an ERP of 85,000 watts.  Its studios are located in Northwest Jackson and the transmitter site is in Raymond.

Programming
WSTZ features John Boy and Billy every weekday morning, and "Brother Dave" weekday afternoons (He left station sometime in 2011). "The Best of John Boy & Billy" comes on every Saturday morning. On Sundays, they have "Sunday Brunch" in the morning, in the afternoon they have "Christian the Drunken Fool", and at night they have "Flashback." On Tuesdays, they feature "Twofer Tuesdays" in which two songs by the same band are played one after another.

External links
Z106.7 Website

STZ-FM
Classic rock radio stations in the United States
IHeartMedia radio stations